Lady Croissant is a live album by Australian singer Sia, released in April 2007 through the record label Astralwerks. Called a "mini-album" by Astralwerks, the collection contains one studio recording ("Pictures") as well as eight live tracks recorded during an April 2006 concert at the Bowery Ballroom in New York City. Eight songs were written or co-written by Sia; also featured is a cover version of Ray Davies' song "I Go to Sleep", a studio recording of which later appeared on Sia's studio album Some People Have Real Problems (2008). The album was produced by Dan Carey, mixed by Jon Lemon and Taz Mattar at Sarm Studios in London, and mastered by Emily Lazar and Sarah Register at The Lodge in New York City. Lady Croissant received a mixed critical reception and spawned one single, "Pictures", which was released exclusively via American Eagle Outfitters on 27 November 2006.

Composition

Just over forty minutes in length, Lady Croissant contains nine "slow-to-mid-tempo" compositions. The album includes one previously unreleased studio recording called "Pictures", co-written by Dan Carey, along with eight live tracks recorded during her 17 April 2006 performance at the Bowery Ballroom in New York City. "Destiny" and "Distractions" each appeared on Zero 7's 2001 album Simple Things, which featured vocals by Sia. Both songs were co-written by Sia and members of Zero 7; "Destiny" was also co-written by Sophie Barker, another vocal contributor to Simple Things. "Blow It All Away" originally appeared on Sia's 2002 studio album Healing Is Difficult, and "Don't Bring Me Down", "Numb" and "Breathe Me" were each released on her 2004 album Colour the Small One. "Lentil" and the cover version of Ray Davies' song "I Go to Sleep", made popular by both Cher and the Pretenders, would later appear on Some People Have Real Problems (2008). The album was produced by Carey, mixed by Jon Lemon and Taz Mattar at Sarm Studios in London and mastered by Emily Lazar and Sarah Register at The Lodge in New York City.

Reception

Lady Croissant received a mixed critical reception. AllMusic's Marisa Brown called Sia's vocal performance "rich and passionate" and compared it to Nelly Furtado and Morley. Brown stated the band was "tight and lush" and that the music was "very modern, warm and melodic and cleanly intricate". In his review for BBC Music, Paul Sullivan wrote that the album successfully displayed Sia's vocal capabilities and versatility. However, he noted the minimal audience participation and felt that this prevented the album from capturing a "live" experience. For Sullivan, highlights included "Don't Bring Me Down", "Destiny", and "Lentil", which he believed were "executed with an appealing mixture of frankness and fluidity". Mark Perlaki of Gigwise.com awarded the album four out of five stars and opined that the album "portrays an artist  star is in the ascendant, whose voice is unrivaled in style and expression, an artist on the brink of deserved and assured greater recognition". The Selby Times review called the collection "mesmerising" and a good indicator of Sia's future work. One reviewer for WERS called the album "breathtaking" and wrote positively of Sia's vocals and the instrumentation. Like Sullivan, the reviewer warned that listeners expecting a traditional live album with "raw cuts and heavy improvisation" might be disappointed.

Roque Strew of Pitchfork Media found Sia's Adelaide accent to be a "liability", specifically noting difference in pronunciation between the studio versions of "Destiny" and "Distractions" and the live performances. Strew complimented "Pictures" and "Lentil", the latter of which shined through the "fog of elongated syllables and cut consonants". Popmatters' Mike Schiller felt the instrumentation was "robotic" and found Sia's vocal manipulation and bending of vowels "infuriating", even unintelligible at times. Schiller did, however, favor her vocal tone and found the power of her voice "occasionally transcendent". Stuart McCaighy of This Is Fake DIY appreciated "Pictures" but also criticized Sia's performance for lacking diversity and for "incomprehensible" vocals due to her slurring of words. McCaighy concluded that, like other live albums, Lady Croissant was redundant but would be appreciated by fans. The Australian publication DNA published a mixed review of the album in 2010 following the release of We Are Born, complimenting Sia's vocals but suggesting that "Pictures"  sounded like a B-side and that the album's release smells like a "cash-in" on her "recent success".

Track listing

Credits adapted from AllMusic.

Personnel

 Kevin Armstrong – composer
 Sophie Barker – composer
 Henry Binns – composer
 Felix Bloxsom – drums
 Dan Carey – bass, composer, engineer, guitar, keyboards, producer, Wurlitzer
 Robin Danar – assistant engineer
 Ray Davies – composer
 John Dent – mastering
 Samuel Dixon – bass, composer
 Tom Elmhirst – mixing
 Sia Furler – composer, vocals
 José González – photography
 Sam Hardaker – composer
 Felix Howard – composer
 Joe Kennedy – keyboards
 Olliver Kraus – cello
 Emily Lazar – mastering
 Joey Lemon – mixing
 Blair MacKichan – composer
 Taz Mattar – mixing engineer
 James McMillan – composer
 Stephanie Pistel – cover photo, photography
 Sarah Register – mastering
 Michael Sendaydiego – photography
 Gus Seyffert – guitar
 Jeff Tweedy – photography
 Joey Waronker – drums

Credits adapted from AllMusic and CD liner notes.

Release history

See also

 Music of Adelaide
 Zero 7 discography

References

2007 live albums
Albums produced by Dan Carey (record producer)
Albums recorded at the Bowery Ballroom
Astralwerks live albums
Live albums by Australian artists
Sia (musician) albums